Clifford David Riley (born 2 February 1927) is a former  Australian rules footballer who played with St Kilda in the Victorian Football League (VFL).

Riley enlisted in the Royal Australian Navy and served during the later part of World War II.

Riley's mother, Bea Riley was Australia's oldest person at 112 years old until her death in 2009.

Notes

External links 

Living people
1927 births
Australian rules footballers from Victoria (Australia)
St Kilda Football Club players
University Blacks Football Club players